Pranami Bora is an Indian actress. she is a well-known actress in Assamese film industry.

Career
Pranami Bora started her career by acting. she acted in Lijin Boss's short film Conditions Apply released in 2010.

Filmography

Awards and nominations

References

External links
 

Living people
Indian film actresses
Year of birth missing (living people)
Actresses in Assamese cinema
Actresses from Assam
21st-century Indian actresses